Graham Curtis (born 12 September 1999) is an Zimbabwe-born Irish rugby union player who plays for Queen's University in the All-Ireland League, and has represented Ireland at Sevens. He preferred position is scrum-half.

Ulster
Curtis joined the Ulster academy in January 2018, following his brother Angus who made his debut for Ulster in 2018. He never played for the Ulster senior team, but represented Ireland Sevens at the World Rugby Sevens Series in Los Angeles and Vancouver in 2019-20. He was no longer listed in Ulster's squad after the 2019-20 season. In December 2021 he was playing for Queen's University in the All-Ireland League.

References

External links
itsrugby.co.uk Profile

1999 births
Living people
Irish rugby union players
Ulster Rugby players
Rugby union scrum-halves
Alumni of Hilton College (South Africa)